The Nelson Leafs are a Junior "B" ice hockey team based in Nelson, British Columbia, Canada. They are members of the Neil Murdoch Division of the Kootenay Conference of the Kootenay International Junior Hockey League (KIJHL). They play their home games at Nelson and District Community Complex.

History

The team was originally known as the Nelson Maple Leafs but changed its name to the Leafs in 1994 when it joined the Rocky Mountain Junior Hockey League (RMJHL). The team returned to the KIJHL in 1999 but continued to be known as the Leafs.

The Leafs are the 1968-69, 1991–92, 1992–93, 1999-00, 2008–09 KIJHL champions.

In the 2006-07 season, the Leafs made it to the KIJHL finals, but lost to the Fernie Ghostriders 4-2. In the 2008-09 season, the Leafs won the KIJHL championship 4-0 over the Kamloops Storm. Then in the 2009-10 season, the Leafs went to the KIJHL finals, but lost 4-1 to the Revelstoke Grizzlies.

The Leafs hosted the Cyclone Taylor Cup, the Junior B provincial championship, in April 2014 but finished fourth.

Season-by-season record

Note: GP = Games played, W = Wins, L = Losses, T = Ties, OTL = Overtime losses, SOL = Shootout losses, D = Defaults, Pts = Points, GF = Goals for, GA = Goals against

Records as of February 27, 2023.

 Notes

 1973-74 season: Nelson withdrew from play for balance of season
 1985-86 season: Nelson withdrew on January 15, 1986
 1986-87 and 1987-88 seasons: Nelson did not participate (folded)
 Stats for the 1990-91 season are only thru February 17, 1991. May not be complete

Playoffs

Records as of March 1, 2012.

 Notes

 The RMJHL playoffs had three playoff rounds.
 The final 1998-99 RMJHL playoffs had two playoff rounds.

Cyclone Taylor Cup

NHL alumni

Other notable alumni
Nyjer Morgan

Awards and trophies

Most Sportsmanlike
Chris Cucullu: 2009-2010
Mike Lebler: 2006-2007
Lindon Horswill: 2011-12

Top Goaltender
Billy Faust: 2009-2010
Garrett Beckwith: 2008-2009

Rookie of the Year
Dylan Walchuk: 2008-2009
Nik Newman: 2011-12

Coach of the Year
Simon Wheeldon: 2008-2009
Simon Wheeldon: 2007-2008
Simon Wheeldon: 2006-2007

Top Defenseman
Torin Brusven: 2007-2008
Jonathon Petrash: 2011-12

Top Scorer
Dan Fraser: 2006-2007
Nik Newman 2011-12

References

External links

Ice hockey teams in British Columbia
Nelson, British Columbia
1968 establishments in British Columbia
Ice hockey clubs established in 1968